The FIS Alpine World Ski Championships 1999 were held February 2–14 in Vail and Beaver Creek, Colorado, U.S.A.

Lasse Kjus of Norway placed in the top two in all five events, winning two gold medals and taking three silvers. Hermann Maier of Austria won gold medals in the two speed events, the downhill and super-G (a dead-heat tie with Kjus).  Austria dominated the women's two speed events with a sweep of all six medals. The men's downhill, super-G, and combined events were held at Beaver Creek, and the seven other events were at Vail.

This was the third non-Olympic World Championships held in the United States, all in Colorado. (The 1960 Winter Olympics in Squaw Valley, California, and the 1980 Winter Olympics in Lake Placid, New York, are also officially considered World Championships).  Vail hosted a decade earlier in 1989 and Aspen in 1950, the first held outside of Europe.  As a host country, the U.S. has won just two medals in the three World Championships, a gold and a bronze by Tamara McKinney in 1989.

The Birds of Prey downhill course at Beaver Creek was developed for these championships, its first World Cup races were in December 1997.  Designed by Olympic gold medalist Bernhard Russi, it has been a regular stop on the men's World Cup schedule and was used again for the World Championships in 2015.

Men's competitions

Downhill
Saturday, February 6, 1999Beaver Creek

Source:

Super-G
Tuesday, February 2, 1999Beaver Creek

Source:

Giant Slalom
Friday, February 12, 1999Vail

Source:

Slalom
Sunday February 14, 1999Vail

Source:

Combined
Monday & Tuesday, February 8–9, 1999Beaver Creek

Source:

Women's competitions

Downhill
Sunday, February 7, 1999Vail

Source:

Super-G
Wednesday, February 3, 1999Vail

Source:

Giant Slalom
Thursday, February 11, 1999Vail

Source:

Slalom
Saturday, February 13, 1999Vail

Source:

Combined
Friday, February 5, 1999Vail

Source:

Medals table

References

External links
FIS-ski.com - results - 1999 World Championships - Vail/Beaver Creek, Colorado, USA
FIS-ski.com - results - World Championships
Vail Valley Foundation - 1999 World Championships

FIS Alpine World Ski Championships
1999
A
Sports competitions in Colorado
1999 in American sports
1999 in sports in Colorado
Alpine skiing competitions in the United States
February 1999 sports events in the United States
Skiing in Colorado